Silvanoprus distinguendus, is a species of silvan flat bark beetle native to India and Sri Lanka. It is also introduced to Belarus.

Description
Average length is about 2.63 to 2.68 mm. Very similar to Silvanoprus longicollis. Can be separated by long and broad antennal scape, distinctly elongated antennal joints 9 and 10 as well as longer temple. Lateral margins of the prothorax are distinctly sinuate and found across anterior one-fourth. In male, aedeagus has a broad and blunt apical projection of median lobe. Boyd is elongated, and slightly depressed. Dorsum is yellowish brown in color and covered with short, semi-erect, golden pubescence. Eyes are short and coarsely faceted. Convex prothorax is elongated and almost parallel sided. Scutellum large and transverse. Elytra long and broad.

References 

Silvanidae
Insects of Sri Lanka
Insects of India
Insects described in 1996